A Javelin is a light spear intended for throwing. It is commonly known from the modern athletic discipline, the Javelin throw.

Javelin may also refer to:

 Pilum, a heavy javelin used as a thrown weapon in the Roman legions
 Javelin argument, a logical argument supporting the infinite size of the universe

Fiction
 Javelin (DC Comics), a DC Comics supervillain
 Javelin (Marvel Comics), a character in Rom Spaceknight, a comic book series published by Marvel Comics
 Javelin, a fictional robot from the Custom Robo series

Military
 FGM-148 Javelin, an American anti-tank missile
 Javelin (surface-to-air missile), a British Army portable missile

Music
 Javelin (band), a two-man pop band started in 2005 
 The Javelins, a 1960s band fronted by Ian Gillan
 Javelin (Torke), a 1994 composition by American composer Michael Torke
 The Javelin, a 1997 album by Blue Amazon, or the title track

Technology
 BlackBerry Curve 8900, or Javelin, a BlackBerry Curve phone
 Javelin Software, software company
 Prism (chipset), or PRISM Javelin, a wireless chipset made by Intersil Corporation

Transportation

Aviation
 ATG Javelin, an American-Israeli civil jet aircraft prototype that did not reach production
 Gloster Javelin, a British "all-weather" jet interceptor aircraft, 1951–1968
 Javelin, American aircraft company, selling plans for the Javelin Wichawk kit-plane
 Argo D-4 Javelin, a former American sounding rocket
 Napier Javelin, a British piston aircraft engine

Maritime
 HMS Javelin (F61), a 1938 World War 2, Royal Navy destroyer
 Javelin dinghy, one of several types of racing dinghy:
 Javelin dinghy (US)
 Javelin dinghy (Europe) (Europe)
 Javelin dinghy (Australasia) (NZ)
 SS Empire Javelin, a 1944 British World War 2 Infantry Landing Ship

Rail
 Javelin (train), the Olympic Javelin, a high speed shuttle service in London for the 2012 Summer Olympics
 British Rail Class 395 the trains used, sometimes referred to as the "Javelin class"

Road
 AMC Javelin, an American automobile
 Dennis Javelin, a British motorcoach
 Jowett Javelin, a British automobile
 JBA Javelin, a kit-car manufactured by JBA Cars

Zoology
 Javelina, a pig-like animal found in the Americas
 Javelin fish, any of several fishes
 Coelorinchus australis, the javelin, a fish found around Australia and New Zealand
 Thorntooth grenadier, the javelin, a name for the fish Lepidorhynchus denticulatus, found around Australia and New Zealand
 Javelin frog, Australian species of frog

See also

 
 Spear (disambiguation)